This is a list of notable past and present residents of the U.S. city of St. Petersburg, Florida, and its surrounding metropolitan area.

Sports

 Kurt Abbott (b. 1969), Major League Baseball shortstop for the Oakland Athletics
 Rodney Adams (b. 1994), professional National Football League player
 Jack Albright (1921–1991), MLB shortstop for the Philadelphia Phillies
 Mike Alstott (b. 1973), football player for Tampa Bay Buccaneers
 Ricky Anderson (b. 1963), All-American football player
 Rolando Arrojo (b. 1965), baseball player; one of first free agents signed by Tampa Bay Devil Rays
 Lynn Barry (b. 1959), basketball player with Women's National Basketball Association
 Chaim Bloom (b. 1983), Senior Vice President of Baseball Operations for the Tampa Bay Rays
 Murle Breer (b. 1939), professional golfer, U.S. Women's Open champion
 Sebastien Bourdais (b. 1979), French professional racing driver
 Joe Buck (b. 1969), Fox Sports announcer
Danielle Collins (b. 1993), professional tennis player 
 Jeff D'Amico (b. 1975), MLB pitcher
 Andrew Friedman (b. 1976), MLB general manager
 Ernest Givins (b. 1964), football player
 Dwight Gooden (b. 1964), MLB pitcher 1984–2000, 4-time All-Star
 Shaquill Griffin (b. 1995), professional NFL player
 Shaquem Griffin (b. 1995), professional NFL player
 Nicole Haislett (b. 1972), Olympic gold medalist in swimming
 Jack Hardy (b. 1959), MLB pitcher
 Barry Horowitz (b. 1959), amateur wrestler, professional wrestler
 Charles Horton (b. ), football player
 Bobby Kline (b. 1929), MLB shortstop for Washington Senators
 Casey Kotchman (b. 1983), MLB first baseman
 Ben Kozlowski (b. 1980), MLB pitcher
 Jeff Lacy (b. 1977), professional boxer
 Max Lanier (1915–2007), MLB player, St. Louis Cardinals
 Ron LeFlore (b. 1948), MLB player, Detroit Tigers
 Gordon Mackenzie (1937–2014), MLB player, minor league manager
Zac MacMath (b. 1991), goalkeeper in Major League Soccer
 Kevin Marion (b. 1984), former professional American and Canadian football player
 Nick Masset (b. 1982), MLB pitcher
 Mark Mendelblatt (b. 1973), yachtsman, silver medalist at 1999 Pan American Games and 2004 Laser World Championships
 Betsy Nagelsen (b. 1956), professional tennis player
 Johnny Nee (1890–1957), baseball scout
 Dan O'Brien (b. 1954), MLB pitcher for St. Louis Cardinals
 Nate Oliver (b. 1940), MLB second baseman
 Ron Plaza (1934–2012), Major League Baseball player and minor league manager
 George Smith (1937–1987), MLB second baseman
 Roy Smith (b. 1976), MLB pitcher
 Speedy Smith (b. 1993), American basketball player for Hapoel Jerusalem of the Israeli Basketball Premier League
 Marreese Speights (b. 1987), basketball player for NCAA champion Florida and NBA champion Golden State Warriors
 Pat Terrell (b. 1968), professional NFL player
 Doug Waechter (b. 1981), MLB pitcher
 Dan Wheldon (1978–2011), Indy Racing League driver (killed in 15-car crash on October 16, 2011)
 Frank Wren (b. 1958), MLB general manager
 Winky Wright (b. 1971), professional boxer
 Jerry Wunsch (b. 1974), professional football player
 Isaiah Wynn (b. 1995), professional NFL player
 Janet Newberry (b. 1953), professional tennis player, US team and Boston Lobsters

Movies, television, other media

 Angela Bassett (b. 1958), actress
 Michael France (1962–2013), screenwriter
 Chris Fuller (b. 1982), filmmaker
 Hank Green (b. 1980), vlogger, musician, entrepreneur, internet celebrity, YouTuber
 Kip Kedersha (b. 1957), creator of YouTube channel Kipkay, YouTuber, internet celebrity
 Dennis Lehane (b. 1965), author
 Will Packer (b. 1974), film producer
 Justin Hires (b. 1985), actor
 Pearl (b. ), drag queen, runner-up on RuPaul's Drag Race season 7
 Rhonda Shear (b. 1954), actress and entrepreneur
 Sean Waltman (b. 1972), professional wrestler, ring names 1–2–3 Kid and X-Pac
 Patrick Wilson (b. 1973), actor

Music, the arts

 David Budd (1927–1991), abstract painter
 Al Downing (1916–2000), jazz musician, member of Tuskegee Airmen
 Todd La Torre (b. 1974), lead singer for progressive metal band Queensrÿche
 Michael Lynche (b. 1983), singer
 Mary Ellen Moylan (1925–2020), ballet dancer
 Iron Mike Norton (b. 1973), swamp stomp recording artist and slide guitarist
 Babs Reingold (b. 
), interdisciplinary artist
Rod Wave (b. 1998), rapper
 John King (ukulelist) (1953-2009), ukulelist

Writers

 Charles B. Dew (b. 1937), historian
 Michele Elliott (b. 1946), author, psychologist and founder of child protection charity Kidscape
 Thomas French (b. 1958), journalist
 Jack Kerouac (1922–1969), leading figure of the beat generation
 Terrence McNally (1938–2020), dramatist two transplanted New Yorkers from Irish Catholic backgrounds.
 Elie Wiesel (1928–2016), Nobel Laureate, writer, political activist, author of Night, about his experience in concentration camps in 1944–1945; taught at Eckerd College during the winter term
 Ernest Vincent Wright (1872–1939), author of Gadsby, a 50,000-word lipogram

Politics

 Charlie Crist (b. 1956), U.S. Representative and former governor of Florida
 Zeola Hershey Misener (1878–1966), suffragist and one of the first women elected to the Indiana General Assembly
 Omali Yeshitela (b. 1941), African Internationalist, Founder of the Uhuru Movement and Chair of the African People's Socialist Party
 Bill Young (1930–2013), U.S. Representative

Miscellaneous

 Tony Ables (b. 1954), serial killer and robber
 Austin Cornelius Dunham (1833–1918), businessman, executive, merchandiser, inventor, philanthropist
 Jarvis Hunt (1863–1941), architect
 Brett James McMullen (b. 1961), United States Air Force General Officer
 Ray Robson (b. 1994), young chess master
 Jimmy Wales (b. 1966), Wikipedia co-founder

References

St. Petersburg, Florida
 
St. Petersburg